Heydar Qoli Khan (Persian: حیدرقلی خان کنگرلی, Azerbaijani: Heydərqulu xan Kəngərli, 1747—1764) was the founder and first ruler of the Nachichevan khanate.

Origin 
He was descended from the Kangarlu tribe, who mainly lived on the territory of the modern Nakhichevan Autonomous Republic in Azerbaijan.

History 
After Nadir Shah of Iran was killed as a result of a conspiracy of the Afshar nobility in 1747, the leader of the Kangarli tribe, Heydar Qoli Khan, removed Agha Hasan, the Shah's governor from power and declared himself an independent khan of Nakhichevan. He carried out a number of measures to strengthen the khanate, develop trade and crafts, which increased the revenues of the treasury: he regulated the routes of communication in the khanate and cities, ordered the repair of old bridges and the construction of new ones. Since the military power of the Nakhichevan Khanate was not great, Heydar Qoli Khan tried to rely on stronger khanates.

To this end, he became an ally of the Karabakh Khan Panah-Ali and together with him and the Georgian king, participated in the campaign against the Shaki Khan Haji Chalabi in 1752. After this unsuccessful campaign, Heydar Kuli Khan began to regulate the economy of his khanate. After his death, Haji Khan Kangarli took his place.

See also 

 Nakhichevan khanate
 Kangarlu (tribe)

References 

18th-century rulers
18th-century rulers in Asia
18th-century rulers in Europe
1764 deaths
Nakhichevan khans
Kangarlis